Utricularia kimberleyensis, the Kimberley bladderwort, is a terrestrial carnivorous plant that belongs to the genus Utricularia (family Lentibulariaceae). Its distribution ranges from the Dampier Peninsula in northern Western Australia to the area around Darwin in the Northern Territory.

See also 
 List of Utricularia species

References 

Carnivorous plants of Australia
Flora of the Northern Territory
Eudicots of Western Australia
kimberleyensis
Lamiales of Australia